Iacob Timciuc  (born 9 February 1954) is a Moldovan politician.

Biography

Iacob Timciuc served as minister of energy (2001–2005), before moving to the Ministry of Foreign Affairs and serving as Moldovan Ambassador to China (2006)
and then ambassador to Korea (2007). He was appointed as Moldovan minister of local public administration in a Cabinet reshuffle on 10 June 2009.

He was a member of the PCRM, the new Communist Party. Iacob Timciuc declared on 17 March 2010 after the plenary session that he quits the Communists' Party, as "it has adopted an anti-national attitude, ignoring the party's general opinion.

References

1954 births
Living people
Government ministers of Moldova
Party of Communists of the Republic of Moldova politicians